The Liberace of Baghdad is a 2005 British documentary film by filmmaker Sean McAllister focusing on the life and music of Iraqi pianist Samir Peter and his family in wartime Baghdad.  The film received a 2005 Sundance Film Festival Special Jury award as well as the 2005 British Independent Film Award for Best British Documentary. Samir Peter previously appeared in the 2004 documentary Voices of Iraq.

See also 
Voices of Iraq

External links 
 
 
Official website for Sean McAllister

2005 film awards
Documentary films about the Iraq War
Documentary films about music and musicians
Films set in Baghdad
Films set in Iraq
Films directed by Sean McAllister